Henrik Risom (born 24 July 1968) is a former Danish footballer who played as a midfielder for Vejle, Lyngby, Dynamo Dresden, Odense, Silkeborg IF, Stoke City and Aarhus GF.

Career
Risom was born in Vildbjerg and began his senior career with Vejle. After four years at Vejle where he played over 100 games he moved on to Lyngby. Three years there then saw him spend one and a half season spell with German side Dynamo Dresden where he played in 15 Bundesliga matches. He returned to Danish football with Odense and Silkeborg IF and had two more years with Vejle. He joined English club Stoke City in August 2000 and joined up with a number of Scandinavian players. He played 24 times for Stoke in 2000–01 before returning to Denmark with Aarhus GF with whom he finished his career with.

During his career, Risom played nine matches for the Denmark national team.

Career statistics
Sources:

International
Source:

References

External links
 

1968 births
Living people
Danish men's footballers
Denmark international footballers
Denmark under-21 international footballers
Vejle Boldklub players
Dynamo Dresden players
Stoke City F.C. players
English Football League players
Bundesliga players
Lyngby Boldklub players
Odense Boldklub players
Silkeborg IF players
Aarhus Gymnastikforening players
Danish Superliga players
Association football midfielders
People from Herning Municipality
Sportspeople from the Central Denmark Region